Baanaadi is a 2014 Indian Kannada language children's film written and directed by debutant Nagaraj Kote, based on the novel Usiru he wrote. It stars Praful Vishwakarma, H. G. Dattatreya and Rajesh Nataranga in the lead roles. The supporting cast features Dhruthi, Abhinaya, Sringeri Ramanna, Jayashree Raj, Venkatachala, T. S. Nagabharana, Mimicry Gopi and Yashwanth Kote. Music for five of the six soundtracks in the film were composed by Karthik Sharma, who, with the film became the youngest composer in the history of Kannada cinema.

Cast 

 Master Praful Vishwakarma as Kishore
H. G. Dattatreya as Kishore's Grandfather
 Rajesh Nataranga as Avinash
 Kumari Dhruthi as Pallavi
 Abhinaya as Kusuma
 Sringeri Ramanna as Thathayya
 Jayashree Raj as Girija
 Venkatachala as Muthyappa
 T. S. Nagabharana as Ashwath Kumar
 Mimicry Gopi as Duduma 
 Yashawantha Kote as Hanumya
 Master Madhusudan
 Bank Janardhan
 Ramesh Pandith
 Mugu Suresh
 Baraguru Ramachandrappa
 Manasi Sudheer
 Mohan Juneja
Nagraj kote as Ranga

Production
Usiru, a novel written by Nagaraj Kote in the 1990s, deals with the upbringing of children in the current era. Deciding to direct a film based on the novel, Kote launched the film in April 2014, having signed Praful Vishwakarma, Rajesh Nataranga and H. G. Dattatreya to play characters of three generations; a young boy, his father and grandfather. The role of Praful's mother was played by Anubhava, who was pregnant during the filming stages. Filming completed in July 2014.

Soundtrack

Karthik Sharma composed the background score for the film and music for five soundtracks in the film. The lyrics were written by Nagaraj Kote and M. N. Vyasa Rao. The track "Henda Hendthi" was taken from one of G. P. Rajarathnam's works, to which the music was composed by Raju Ananthaswamy. Another track "Yaaru Baruvaru" was taken from the works of Purandara Dasa, a Carnatic music composer who lived in the 16th century. The album consists of six soundtracks. It was released on 26 July 2014, in Bangalore.

Critical reception 
Upon theatrical release, the film received positive reviews from critics. B. S. Srivani of Deccan Herald felt that the film was successful in "conveying the message quite effectively". She concluded writing praises of the acting performances and the music in the film. G. S. Kumar of The Times of India reviewed the film and wrote, "Director Nagaraja Kote has chosen a topic with a social message and made best use of Hagalu Vesha. Their performance blends well with the story." He concluded giving special mention to the Dattatreya's performance and the film's cinematography.

References

External links
 
 Nagaraj Kote Director website

2014 films
2010s Kannada-language films
Indian children's films
Films based on Indian novels